1916 – National Park Service Organic Act created the National Park Service.
 1947 – Los Angeles Air Pollution Control District created; first air pollution agency in the US.
 1948 – Federal Water Pollution Control Act
 1955 – National Air Pollution Control Act
 1959 – California Motor Vehicle Pollution Control Board created to test automobile emissions and set standards.
 1963 – Clean Air Act (amended in 1965, 1966, 1967, 1969, 1970, 1977, 1990)
 1964 – Wilderness Act
 1965 – National Emissions Standards Act
 1965 – Motor Vehicle Air Pollution Control Act
 1965 – Solid Waste Disposal Act (amended by RCRA in 1976)
 1967 – California Air Resources Board established; set emissions standards predating EPA.
 1967 – Air Quality Act (amendment to CAA)
 1969 – Federal Coal Mine Health and Safety Act
 1969 – National Environmental Policy Act (NEPA)
 1970 – Reorganization Plan No. 3 created the Environmental Protection Agency (EPA) by Presidential Executive Order
 1970 – Clean Air Act (Extension). Major rewrite of CAA, setting National Ambient Air Quality Standards (NAAQS), New Source Performance Standards (NSPS) Hazardous Air Pollutant standards, and auto emissions tailpipe standards.
 1970 – Williams-Steiger Occupational Safety and Health Act (created OSHA and NIOSH)
 1970 – Lead-Based Paint Poisoning Prevention Act
 1970 – Environmental Quality Improvement Act
 1972 – Federal Water Pollution Control Amendments of 1972 (P.L. 92-500). Major rewrite.
 1972 – Federal Insecticide, Fungicide, and Rodenticide Act (FIFRA) (amended by Food Quality Protection Act of 1996)
 1972 – Marine Protection, Research, and Sanctuaries Act of 1972
 1973 – Endangered Species Act (amended 1978, 1982)
 1974 – Safe Drinking Water Act (amended 1986, 1996)
 1975 – Hazardous Materials Transportation Act
 1976 – Resource Conservation and Recovery Act (RCRA) (amended 1984, 1996)
 1976 – Toxic Substances Control Act (TSCA) (amended 2016)
 1977 – Clean Water Act (amended FWPCA of 1972)
 1977 – Surface Mining Control and Reclamation Act
 1978 – National Energy Conservation Policy Act
 1978 – Endangered Species Act Amendments
 1980 – Comprehensive Environmental Response, Compensation, and Liability Act (CERCLA). Created the Superfund program.
 1980 – Alaska National Interest Lands Conservation Act
 1980 – Fish and Wildlife Conservation Act
 1982 – Nuclear Waste Policy Act
 1982 – Endangered Species Act Amendments of 1982
 1984 – Hazardous and Solid Waste Amendments of 1984
 1986 – Safe Drinking Water Act Amendments of 1986
 1986 – Emergency Planning and Community Right-to-Know Act (EPCRKA)
 1986 – Superfund Amendments and Reauthorization Act (SARA)
 1987 – Water Quality Act (amended FWPCA of 1972)
 1989 – Basel Convention
 1989 – Montreal Protocol on ozone-depleting chemicals enters into force.
 1990 – Clean Air Act Amendments of 1990. Set new automobile emissions standards, low-sulfur gas, required Best Available Control Technology (BACT) for toxins, reduction in CFCs.
 1990 – Oil Pollution Act of 1990
 1991 – Intermodal Surface Transportation Efficiency Act (ISTEA)
 1992 – Residential Lead-Based Paint Hazard Reduction Act
 1993 – North American Free Trade Agreement (Implementation Act)
 1994 – Executive Order 12898 on Environmental Justice
 1996 – Mercury-Containing and Rechargeable Battery Management Act (P.L. 104-19)
 1996 – Food Quality Protection Act (amended FIFRA)
 1996 – Safe Drinking Water Act Amendments of 1996
 1996 – Land Disposal Program Flexibility Act of 1996
 1997 – Kyoto Protocol
 1998 – Transportation Equity Act for the 21st Century (TEA-21)
 2002 – California AB 1493 sets standards for emissions of CO2 and other greenhouse gases from automobiles and light duty trucks.
 2002 – Small Business Liability Relief and Brownfields Revitalization Act (amended CERCLA)
 2005 – Energy Policy Act of 2005
 2005 – Safe, Accountable, Flexible, Efficient Transportation Equity Act: A Legacy for Users (SAFETEA)
 2007 – Energy Independence and Security Act (EISA)
 2016 – Frank R. Lautenberg Chemical Safety for the 21st Century Act (amended TSCA)

See also
 United States Environmental Protection Agency (EPA)
 Occupational Safety and Health Administration (OSHA)
 Timeline of environmental events
 Workers' compensation

References

 
 * 

Environmental law in the United States
United States federal labor legislation
Environmental and occupational health legislation
United States environment-related lists
United States health-related lists